Burzakan (also Romanized as Būrzakān; also known as Borzakān and Borzekān) is a village in Khvajehei Rural District, Meymand District, Firuzabad County, Fars Province, Iran. At the 2006 census, its population was 112, in 24 families.

References 

Populated places in Firuzabad County